Juan José Urráburu (1844–1904) was a Spanish Jesuit and a scholastic philosopher who worked for some time as a professor of philosophy at the Gregorian University in Rome. Beginning in 1890, he published eight large volumes treating of  Scholastic philosophy under the title Institutiones Philosophicae. The last volume appeared in 1900, though he reworked the Institutiones into the slightly abbreviated five-volume Compendium Philosophiae Scholasticae.

Works
1890, Institutiones Philosophicae, Volumen Primum: Logica
1891, Institutiones Philosophicae, Volumen Secundum: Ontologia
1892, Institutiones Philosophicae, Volumen Tertium: Cosmologiam
1894, Institutiones Philosophicae, Volumen Quartum: Psychologiae, Pars Prima
1896, Institutiones Philosophicae, Volumen Quintum: Psychologiae, Pars Secunda (first half)
1898, Institutiones Philosophicae, Volumen Sextum: Psychologiae, Pars Secunda (second half)
1899, Institutiones Philosophicae, Volumen Septimum: Theodiceae, Primum
1900, Institutiones Philosophicae, Volumen Octavum: Theodiceae, Secundum

References
Catholic Encyclopedia article

Sources
Perrier, Joseph Louis (1909). The Revival of Scholastic Philosophy in the Nineteenth Century. Columbia University Press.

So What's New About Scholasticism?. Ed. Rajesh Heynickx and Stephane Symons. Walter de Gruyter GmbH. ISBN 9783110588255.

1844 births
1904 deaths
19th-century Spanish Jesuits
Spanish philosophers
Basque Jesuits
People from Biscay